Constituency PP-171 (Nankana Sahib-II) was a Constituency of Provincial Assembly of Punjab.It was abolished in 2018 delimitations because Nankana Sahib District lost 1 seat after 2017 Census

General elections 2013
General elections were held on 11 May 2013.
Rana Muhammad Arshad Of PMLN won with 37,342 votes and became the member of provincial assembly.

General elections 2008
Rana Muhammad Arshad Of PMLN won became the member of provincial assembly.

See also

 Punjab, Pakistan

References

External links
 Election commission Pakistan's official website
 Awazoday.com check result
 Official Website of Government of Punjab

Constituencies of Punjab, Pakistan